Laughing Bill Hyde is a lost 1918 American adventure film directed by Hobart Henley and written by Willard Mack. The film stars Will Rogers, Anna Lehr, Clarence Oliver, Joseph Herbert, Robert Conville, and Dan Mason. The film was released on September 22, 1918, by Goldwyn Pictures. It was filmed at the Fort Lee studios.

Plot

Cast       
Will Rogers as Bill Hyde
Anna Lehr as Ponotah
Clarence Oliver as Dr. Evan Thomas
Joseph Herbert as Joseph Wesley Slayforth
Robert Conville as Denny Slevin
Dan Mason as Denny Dorgan
John St. Polis as Black Jack Burg 
Mabel Ballin as Alice Walker

References

External links

1918 films
American adventure films
1918 adventure films
Goldwyn Pictures films
Films directed by Hobart Henley
American silent feature films
American black-and-white films
Lost American films
Films shot in Fort Lee, New Jersey
1918 lost films
Lost adventure films
Films based on works by Rex Beach
1910s English-language films
1910s American films
Silent adventure films